Kirsti Coward (born 19 December 1940) is a Norwegian judge.

She was born in Kristiansand as the daughter of rector Gorgus Coward. She graduated with the cand.jur. degree from the University of Oslo in 1963, and worked as a research assistant there for a period. She was hired in the Ministry of Justice and the Police in 1965. She worked as deputy under-secretary of state there from 1988 to 1994, and as a Supreme Court Justice from 1994 to her retirement in 2010.

From 1989 to 1995 she was a member of the board and deputy leader of the Norwegian Mountain Touring Association. From  2009 she chaired the Rådet for taushetsplikt og forskning.

References

1940 births
Living people
University of Oslo alumni
Norwegian civil servants
Supreme Court of Norway justices
Norwegian women judges
People from Kristiansand